The following are the football (soccer) events of the year 2002 throughout the world.

Events
8 January – MLS contracts league down to ten clubs by eliminating its two Florida franchises: Tampa Bay Mutiny and Miami Fusion.
13 February – Dick Advocaat is reinstated as the manager of the Netherlands, as the successor of the failing Louis van Gaal, with a 1–1 draw in a friendly against England in Amsterdam.
The 2002 FIFA World Cup Korea/Japan is held from 31 May to 30 June in South Korea and Japan. Brazil wins its fifth title, defeating Germany 2–0 in the final. Surprisingly, Turkey and host nation South Korea take 3rd and 4th. This is the first time a World Cup is held in Asia and by two countries simultaneously.
UEFA Champions League: Real Madrid beats Bayer Leverkusen 2–1 in the final. This was Real Madrid's 9th European Cup.
UEFA Cup: Feyenoord wins 3–2 in the final against Borussia Dortmund, winning the cup for the second time.
European Super Cup: Real Madrid wins 3–1 over Feyenoord, winning the cup for the first time.
Scotland – Scottish Premier League: Celtic win the league with an overall points tally of 103, a new record.
Copa Libertadores 2002: Olimpia of Paraguay wins the final on a penalty shootout (4–2) against São Caetano of Brazil.
England – FA Cup: Arsenal wins 2–0 over Chelsea.
Asian Champions Cup – Suwon Samsung Bluewings retain the Asian Champions Cup, defeating fellow South Korean club Anyang LG Cheetahs 4–2 on penalties. They also retained the Asian Super Cup.
May – Arsenal wins The Double
31 August – Real Madrid signs Inter Milan's World Cup winner Ronaldo with a transfer fee of €45 million.
1 October – Gerard van der Lem is named manager of the Saudi Arabia national football team.
3 December – Real Madrid wins the Intercontinental Cup in Tokyo, Japan for the third time, by defeating Paraguay's Olimpia Asunción: 2–0.

Winners of national club championship

Asia
:
Pro League – Persepolis
Azadegan League – Sanat Naft
Hazfi Cup – Esteghlal
  – Júbilo Iwata
  – Al-Ittihad
  – Seongnam Ilhwa Chunma
  – Osotspa M-150

Europe
 Croatia – NK Zagreb
 Denmark – Brøndby
 England – Arsenal
 France – Lyon
 Germany – Borussia Dortmund
 Iceland – KR
 Ireland – Shelbourne
 Italy – Juventus
 Netherlands
 Eredivisie – Ajax
 Eerste Divisie – Zwolle
 Portugal – Sporting CP
 Russia – Lokomotiv Moscow
 Scotland – Celtic
 Spain
 La Liga – Valencia
 Copa del Rey – Deportivo La Coruña
Sweden: for fuller coverage, see: 2002 in Swedish football
Allsvenskan and Svenska Cupen – Djurgården
 Turkey – Galatasaray
 Ukraine – Shakhtar Donetsk
 FR Yugoslavia – Partizan

North and Central America
 – Ottawa Wizards (CPSL)
 
Verano 2002 – Club América
Apertura 2002 – Club Toluca
  – Los Angeles Galaxy (MLS)

South America
 Argentina:
2001–02 Clausura – River Plate
2002–03 Apertura – Independiente
 Bolivia – Bolívar
 Brazil – Santos
 Ecuador – Emelec
 Paraguay – Libertad
 Uruguay – Nacional

International tournaments
 African Cup of Nations in Mali (19 January – 13 February 2002)
 
 
 
 FIFA World Cup in South Korea and Japan (31 May – 30 June 2002)

National team results

Europe





South America







Births
 7 January – Mohamed Daramy, Danish international
 16 January – Bagas Kaffa, Indonesian youth international
 18 January – Karim Adeyemi, German international
 January 30 – Marco Di Cesare, Argentine club footballer
 31 January – Giovanni, Brazilian footballer
 3 February – Radu Drăgușin, Romanian international
 15 February – Zuriko Davitashvili, Georgian international
 10 March 
Ian Maatsen, Dutch footballer
Noni Madueke, English youth international
 27 April – Anthony Elanga, Swedish international
 13 May – Eugenio Pizzuto, Mexican youth international
 16 May – Kenneth Taylor, Dutch international
 7 June – Tomáš Suslov, Slovak international
 19 June – Efraín Álvarez, Mexican international
 11 July – Amad Diallo, Ivorian international
 25 July – Adam Hložek, Czech international
 30 August – Fábio Carvalho, Portuguese youth international
 20 October – Yeremy Pino, Spanish international
 23 October – Elkan Baggott, Indonesian footballer
 31 October – Ansu Fati, Spanish international
 10 November – Eduardo Camavinga, French international
 13 November – Giovanni Reyna, U.S. international

Deaths

February
 8 February – Zizinho, Brazilian midfielder, winner of the Best Player Award at the 1950 FIFA World Cup. (80)
 12 February – John Eriksen (44), Danish international
 16 February – Walter Winterbottom (89), English manager
 20 February – Cristian Neamtu, Romanian player

March
 4 March – Velibor Vasović (62), Yugoslavian footballer

April
 16 April – Billy Ayre (49), English footballer and manager

May
 13 May – Valeri Lobanovsky (63), Ukrainian footballer and manager

June
 17 June – Fritz Walter (81), German World cup winning (1954) footballer

July
 25 July – Hans Dorjee (60), Dutch footballer and manager

August
 8 August – Reiner Geye (52), German footballer

September
 17 September – Edvaldo Alves de Santa Rosa, Brazilian forward, winner of the 1958 FIFA World Cup. (68)
 22 September – Julio Pérez, Uruguayan striker, winner of the 1950 FIFA World Cup. (76)

October
 24 October – Hermán Gaviria (32), Colombian footballer

November
 1 November – Lester Morgan (26), Costa Rican footballer
 9 November – Eusebio Tejera, Uruguayan defender, winner of the 1950 FIFA World Cup. (80)
 12 November – Raoul Diagne (92), French footballer
 13 November – Juan Alberto Schiaffino, Uruguayan forward, winner of the 1950 FIFA World Cup, ranked as the best Uruguayan footballer of all time by an IFFHS poll. (77)

Movies
Bend It Like Beckham (UK)

References

 
Association football by year